Hypospila iridicolor is a species of moth in the family Erebidae. It is found in Indonesia (Ambon Island).

References

Moths described in 1884
Hypospila